Army general is the highest ranked general officer in many countries that use the French Revolutionary System. Army general is normally the highest rank used in peacetime.

In countries that adopt the general officer four-rank system, it is the rank of a general commanding a field army. However, in some countries such as Brazil, Ecuador and Peru, which have adopted the three-rank system, the rank of army general is immediately above that of divisional general. As such, it is the rank of commander of an army corps or larger formations. The equivalent position in the Commonwealth, U.S., and several other countries is simply general, four-star rank, or informally "full general". 

The title "army general" should not be confused with the rank "general of the army", which is more senior, and corresponds to  marshal or field marshal.

Country specific

Army general ranks by country
Army general (France)
Army general (East Germany)
Army general (Russia)
Army general (Soviet Union)
Army general (Vietnam)
Army general (Kingdom of Yugoslavia)

Army generals' army insignia

Army generals' air force insignia

References

Military ranks
Army generals